Rafael "Rafy" Dones (died in 1984) was a Puerto Rican alleged drug dealer and independence advocate. Dones was known for allegedly being one of the first "bichotes"- or drug lords-in Puerto Rico. Dones was friends with Filiberto Ojeda Rios, and he was alleged to have had connections to Los Macheteros, a clandestine militant and insurgent organization that advocates for Puerto Rico's independence from the United States.

Accusations
Dones was accused of drug dealing in 1974. Pablo Padilla, who was to be a witness in Dones' trial, was murdered on December 14 of that year, three days before he was to take the stand in the trial against Dones. 

In 1977, Dones was accused of being the intellectual author  of Padilla's murder. The Padilla murder case received substantial attention on Puerto Rican press, to the point that Dones' lawyers asked for a mistrial based on their belief that the case's jurors were allowed to read articles about it on newspapers such as El Vocero. Their motion was denied.

Death
Dones was gunned down in 1984 as he was leaving a hospital, where he had gone to a rehab center to treat an addiction to methadone that he had developed.

See also
 List of Puerto Ricans
 Alex Trujillo
 Edsel Torres Gomez
 Papo Cachete
 Illegal drug trade in Puerto Rico

References

1984 deaths
Puerto Rican criminals
Deaths by firearm in Puerto Rico
Puerto Rican drug traffickers